The 2008–09 season was Football Club Internazionale Milano's 100th in existence and 93rd consecutive season in the top flight of Italian football. This was the first season for new Inter manager José Mourinho.

Season overview
After Roberto Mancini's departure, José Mourinho became the new coach of Inter. The Portuguese manager won a trophy at his debut, Supercoppa Italiana, defeating Roma on penalties. He planned a 4–3–3 formation, with the new arrivals Amantino Mancini and Quaresma as wingers beside Zlatan Ibrahimović.

As the 4–3–3 soon failed, Mourino reviewed his ideas switching in a 4–3–1–2 like the predecessor: Stanković acted as playmaker, behind Ibrahimović and his offensive partner (Adriano, rarely Cruz or Crespo, then Balotelli). The quality of playing is immediately awake, and Inter came on the prints of previous season winning again the Scudetto (fourth in row), 10 points clear Juventus and Milan.

Players

Squad information

From youth squad

Players transfer
2008–09 confirmed transfers

In

Total spending:  €46.6 million

Out

Total income:  €0

Start formations

Club

Non-playing staff

Pre-season and friendlies

Riscone di Brunico training camp

Tim Trophy

2008 Amsterdam tournament

Other friendlies

Competitions

Overview

Serie A

League table

Results summary

Results by round

Matches

Coppa Italia

Round of 16

Quarter-finals

Semi-finals

Supercoppa Italiana

UEFA Champions League

Group stage

Knockout phase

Round of 16

Statistics

Squad statistics
{|class="wikitable" style="text-align: center;"
|-
!
! style="width:70px;"|League
! style="width:70px;"|Europe
! style="width:70px;"|Cup
! style="width:70px;"|Others
! style="width:70px;"|Total Stats
|-
|align=left|Games played     || 38 || 8 || 4 || 1 || 51
|-
|align=left|Games won        || 25 || 2 || 3 || 0 || 30
|-
|align=left|Games drawn      || 9 || 3 || 0 || 1 || 13
|-
|align=left|Games lost       || 4 || 3 || 1 || 0 || 8
|-
|align=left|Goals scored     || 70 || 8 || 6 || 2 || 86
|-
|align=left|Goals conceded   || 32 || 9 || 5 || 2 || 48
|-
|align=left|Goal difference  || 38 || -1 || 1 || 0 || 38
|-
|align=left|Clean sheets     || 17 || 3 || 1 || 0 || 21
|-
|align=left|Goal by substitute || – || – || – || – || –
|-
|align=left|Total shots      || – || – || – || –|| –
|-
|align=left|Shots on target  || – || – || – || –|| –
|-
|align=left|Corners          || – || – || – || –|| –
|-
|align=left|Players used     || 29 || 23 || 24 || 14 || –
|-
|align=left|Offsides         || – || – || – || –|| –
|-
|align=left|Fouls suffered   || – || – || – || –|| –
|-
|align=left|Fouls committed  || – || – || – || –|| –
|-
|align=left|Yellow cards     || 82 || 11 || 12 || 3 || 108
|-
|align=left|Red cards        || 4 || 1 || – || –|| 5
|-

Players Used: Internazionale has used a total of – different players in all competitions.

Appearances and goals

|-
! colspan=14 style=background:#dcdcdc; text-align:center| Players transferred out during the season

|-

Goalscorers

Last updated: 31 May 2009

Assists

Last updated: 31 May 2009

Clean sheets
The list is sorted by shirt number when total appearances are equal.

Disciplinary record

Last updated: 31 May 2009

References

2008-09
Internazionale
2009